The 2018 MLB Japan All-Star Series was the twelfth edition of the MLB Japan All-Star Series, a best-of-six series between an All-Star team from Major League Baseball (MLB) and for the second time in series history, the Japanese national team, Samurai Japan won. The manager of Samurai Japan saw in this championship a big opportunity for Japan to gain momentum for the 2020 Olympics.

History
On May 1, 2018, MLB announced that it would send an all-star team to tour Japan after the end of the current season, with six games scheduled against a select Nippon Professional Baseball squad from November 9 to 15.

On August 20, 2018, Samurai Japan announced that held one exhibition game against Chinese Taipei and five coaches and six selected players.

On September 10, 2018, Major League Baseball Players Association and MLB announced the first eight selected MLB players.

On October 9, Tomoyuki Sugano canceled his participation for Samurai Japan.

On October 10, Samurai Japan announced all selected 28 players.

On October 15, Chinese Taipei announced all selected 24 players.

On October 18, 2018, Katsuki Azuma canceled his participation for Samurai Japan.

On October 26, 2018, Taichi Ishiyama and Yoshitomo Tsutsugo canceled their participation for Samurai Japan.

On November 1, 2018, Takahiro Matsunaga canceled his participation for Samurai Japan.

On November 2, 2018, Shuta Ishikawa canceled his participation for Samurai Japan, and Che-hsuan Lin canceled his participation for Chinese Taipei.

On November 5, 2018,  canceled his participation for Chinese Taipei.

On November 16, 2018, Yomiuri Giants announced all selected players.

For the first time, the MLB All-Star team stopped in Hawai'i en route to the Japan All-Star series. The 28 player team batted in two workout games in front of fans at Les Murakami Stadium on November 3 & 4, 2018.

Results
Exhibition

Championship

Rosters

Live broadcasting
 TV Asahi, Nippon Television, Fuji TV, TBS, BS-TBS (Japan)
 MLB Network (US & Canada)

References

External links

2018 in Japanese sport
2018 in baseball
MLB Japan All-Star Series
MLB Japan All-Star Series
Sports competitions in Tokyo
Sports competitions in Hiroshima
Sports competitions in Nagoya